Peltogyne, commonly known as purpleheart, violet wood, amaranth and other local names (often referencing the colour of the wood) is a genus of 23 species of flowering plants in the family Fabaceae; native to tropical rainforests of Central and South America; from  Guerrero, Mexico, through Central America, and as far as south-eastern Brazil.

The flowers are small, with five white petals, produced in panicles. The fruit is a pod containing a single seed. The timber is desirable, but difficult to work.

Distribution
The species of the genus range from southeastern Brazil through northern South America, Panama, Costa Rica, and Trinidad, with the majority of species in the Amazon Basin. P. mexicana is a geographic outlier, native to the Mexican state of Guerrero. Overharvesting has caused several species to become endangered in areas where they were once abundant.

Wood
The trees are prized for their beautiful heartwood which, when cut, quickly turns from a light brown to a rich purple color. Exposure to ultraviolet (UV) light darkens the wood to a brown color with a slight hue of the original purple. This effect can be minimized with a finish containing a UV inhibitor. The dry timber is very hard, stiff, and dense with a specific gravity of 0.86. Purpleheart is correspondingly difficult to work with. It is very durable and water-resistant.

Uses and hazards
Purpleheart is prized for use in fine inlay work especially on musical instruments, guitar fret boards (although rarely), woodturning, cabinetry, flooring, and furniture. It is also used in many hobby woodworking projects, such as bottle stoppers, pens, bowls, knife scales, and jewelry boxes. The timber is also valuable in applications that require toughness, such as truck decking.

Purpleheart presents a number of challenges in the woodshop. Its hard-to-detect interlocking grain makes hand-planing, chiseling and working with carving tools a challenge. However, woodturners can note that with sharp tools, it turns clean, and sands well.  

Exposure to the dust generated by cutting and sanding purpleheart can cause skin, eye, and respiratory irritation and nausea, possibly because of the presence of dalbergione (neoflavonoid) compounds in the wood. This also makes purpleheart wood unsuitable to most people for use in jewelry. Purpleheart is also a fairly expensive wood, which is why it is usually used in smaller-scale projects.

Species
The following list of species is according to Plants of the World Online.
Peltogyne altissima Ducke
Peltogyne angustiflora Ducke
Peltogyne campestris Ducke
Peltogyne catingae Ducke
Peltogyne chrysopis Barneby
Peltogyne crenulata Afr.Fern.
Peltogyne discolor Vogel
Peltogyne excelsa Ducke
Peltogyne floribunda (Kunth) Pittier
Peltogyne gracilipes Ducke
Peltogyne heterophylla M.F.Silva
Peltogyne lecointei Ducke
Peltogyne maranhensis Ducke
Peltogyne mattosiana Rizzini
Peltogyne mexicana Martinez
Peltogyne paniculata Benth.
Peltogyne paradoxa Ducke
Peltogyne parvifolia Benth.
Peltogyne pauciflora Benth.
Peltogyne prancei M.F.Silva
Peltogyne purpurea Pittier
Peltogyne recifensis Ducke
Peltogyne subsessilis W.A.Rodrigues
Peltogyne venosa (M.Vahl) Benth.

Gallery

References

 Virtual Flora of Guyana: Peltogyne herbarium photos

  

Detarioideae
Fabaceae genera
Flora of Guyana
Flora of Brazil
Flora of Suriname